Events of the year 2023 in Armenia.

Incumbents 

 President: Vahagn Khachaturyan
 Prime Minister: Nikol Pashinyan

Events

January 

 10 January – Armenian prime minister Nikol Pashinyan announces the postponement of joint military exercises with the Russian Armed Forces under the Collective Security Treaty Organization this year, citing the organization's refusal to condemn Azerbaijan over the disputes.
 19 January – Fifteen servicemen are killed and seven others are injured after a fire breaks out at a military barrack in Azat.
 23 January – The European Union Mission in Armenia begins its mandate.

February 
 16 February – Armenia submits a peace treaty to Azerbaijan in an effort to end the decades-long conflict between the two countries.
 23 February – State Minister Ruben Vardanyan of the unrecognized Republic of Artsakh is dismissed by President Arayik Harutyunyan after less than four months in office.

March 

 5 March – Nagorno-Karabakh conflict: Three Armenian police officers and two Azerbaijani soldiers are killed during border clashes near the Lachin Corridor. Both nations accuse each other of opening fire first.

Sports 

 29 July 2022 – May 2023: 2022–23 Armenian Premier League
 2022–23 Armenian Cup

See also 

 Outline of Armenia
 Index of Armenia-related articles
 List of Armenia-related topics
 History of Armenia

References 

 
2020s in Armenia
Years of the 21st century in Armenia
Armenia
Armenia
Armenia